Michael Winter (born May 20, 1976 in Munich) is a German sport shooter. Winter represented Germany at the 2008 Summer Olympics in Beijing, where he competed for all three rifle shooting events.

In his first event, 10 m air rifle, Winter was able to hit a total of 588 points within six attempts, finishing thirty-sixth in the qualifying rounds. Few days later, he placed thirty-first in the 50 m rifle prone, by one target ahead of Switzerland's Marcel Bürge from the final attempt, with a total score of 590 points. In his third and last event, 50 m rifle 3 positions, Winter was able to shoot 396 targets in a prone position, and 385 each in standing and in kneeling, for a total score of 1,166 points, finishing only in seventeenth place.

References

External links
NBC Olympics Profile

German male sport shooters
Living people
Olympic shooters of Germany
Shooters at the 2008 Summer Olympics
Sportspeople from Munich
1976 births